Roger Piérard (born 28 August 1887, date of death unknown) was a Belgian footballer. He played in eight matches for the Belgium national football team from 1906 to 1909.

References

External links
 

1887 births
Year of death missing
Belgian footballers
Belgium international footballers
Place of birth missing
Association footballers not categorized by position